was a Japanese film and television actor. He played the lead role in Akira Kurosawa's  first feature, Sanshiro Sugata, and appeared in other Kurosawa films including  The Men Who Tread On the Tiger's Tail (as Togashi, commander of the border guards) and The Hidden Fortress (as General Tadokoro). Later, he was a supporting actor in Ishirō Honda's Mothra vs. Godzilla, among many other films.

Before and during World War II Fujita was considered one of the great stars of Japanese cinema. In the post-war period he became known for supporting roles, often playing a soldier in war films, such as in Masaki Kobayashi's The Human Condition (film series). During the sixties and seventies he played minor roles in "special effects pictures" such as Ultraman and Frankenstein vs. Baragon.

Life and career

Fujita was born in Kurume, Fukuoka in Japan. After graduating from high school in 1929 he moved to Tokyo, where he took entrance examinations for several universities, but failed to gain admission. Before returning to Fukuoka he stayed in Kyoto with Takuji Furumi, a film director from his home town. With assistance from Furumi, he secured employment with producer Utaemon Ishikawa as an extra. He was hired as an actor by Toa Cinema, but did not appear in any films that year. In 1932 he was drafted into military service and enlisted in the 12th Artillery Division. After being discharged from the army in 1934, Fujita went to work for Masahiro Makino's Kyoto Film Recording as an audio engineer. He returned to acting in 1939, when he moved to Toho studios.

Beginning in 1941 he played a succession of leading roles, including . In 1943 he appeared in Sanshiro Sugata, the directorial debut of Akira Kurosawa, which brought him to wide popularity. He was in the midst of filming The Men Who Tread On the Tiger's Tail when World War II ended.

After the war, Fujita condemned his own portrayal of war heroes and considered leaving acting. However, unable to see himself in any other profession, he returned to the screen. In 1946 he appeared in Kurosawa's first post-war film, No Regrets for Our Youth, about a war-time liberal who was executed for treason.

During a strike at Toho in 1948 Fujita, along with Denjiro Ōkochi, Kazuo Hasegawa and other members of the so-called "Flag ten" secession union broke away to form a new studio, Shintoho (New Toho). This reorganization ended Fujita's collaboration with Kurosawa. At Shintoho, he appeared in several melodramas and action films.

After his contract with Shintoho ended in 1957, Fujita returned to Toho, where he appeared primarily in supporting roles. Fujita and Kurosawa worked together again on The Hidden Fortress in 1958. Although Fujita appeared in a supporting role, it was essential to the film. He appeared in three more Kurosawa films, including Yojimbo, but only in minor roles.

Selected filmography

 Hataraku ikka (1939) - Genji's fellow worker (uncredited)
 Shanhai rikusentai (1939) - Marine N.C.O. (uncredited)
 Ribbon o musubu fujin (1939)
 Byakuran no uta: zenpen: kōhen (1939)
 Moyuru ōzora (1940)
 Tsuma no baai (1940)
 Kaigun bakugekitai (1940)
 Okumura Ioko (1940)
 Nessa no chikai (1940) - Chen Suyan
 Shidō monogatari (1941) - Shintaro Sagawa
 Seishun no kiryū (1942) - Murakami
 Midori no daichi (1942)
 Haha wa shinazu (1942)
 Hawaii Mare okikaisen (1942) - Yamashita
 Sanshiro Sugata (aka Judo Saga) (1943) - Sanshiro Sugata
 Wakaki hi no yorokobi (1943) - Naotaro Fujita
 Neppū (1943)
 Himetaru kakugo (1943) - Navy officer
 Kato hayabusa sento-tai (1944)
 Raigekitai Shutsudō (1944)
 Raigekitai shutsudo (1944)
 Nichijō no tatakai (1944)
 Kanjōkai no bara (1945)
 Sanshiro Sugata Part II (1945) - Sanshiro Sugata
 Nihon kengō den (1945) - Yagyu Tajima-no-kami
 Kita no san-nin (1945) - Kakuta
 Koi no fuunjî (1945)
 The Men Who Tread On the Tiger's Tail (1945) - Togashi
 Urashima Tarō no kōei (1946) - Goro Urashima
 Minshū no Teki (1946)
 Those Who Make Tomorrow (1946) - Fujita
 Reijin (1946) - Shinichi Tazawa
 No Regrets for Our Youth (1946) - Ruykichi Noge
 Aru yo no Tonosama (1946)
 A Thousand and One Nights with Toho (1947)
 Kâkedashî jidaî (1947)
 Hana hiraku - Machiko yori (1948) - Teruhiko Kuwai
 Issun-boshi (1948)
 Ikiteiru gazō (1948) - Yutaka Nambara
 Shirozukin arawaru (1949) - Senta
 Kirare no Senta (1949)
 Mori no Ishimatsu (1949) - Ishimatsu
 Umi no G-men (1950)
 Kai Jo G-Men (1950)
 Sasameyuki (1950) - Minoru Mimaki
 Hi no tori (1950)
 Netsudeichi (1950)
 Ginza Sanshiro (1950)
 Jiyuu gakko (1951) - Hei-san
 Bungawan soro (1951)
 Avalanche (1952) - Kōsuke Kijima
 Himeyuri no tō (1953) - Dr. Oka
 Kenbei (1953)
 Senkan Yamato (1953) - Jiro Nomura
 Waga koi no lila no kokage ni (1953)
 Hana to ryū - Dai-ichi-bu: Dōkai-wan no rantō (1954) - Kingorō Tamai
 Hana to ryū - Dai-ni-bu: Aijō ruten (1954) - Kingorō Tamai
 Horafuki tanji (1954) - Farmer Tanji
 Sensuikan Rogō imada fujōsezu (1954)
 Nihon yaburezu (1954)
 Hana to ryu (1954)
 Non-chan kumo ni noru (1955) - Nobuko's father
 Ai no rekishi (1955) - Ichirō Kaibara
 Hokkai no hanran (1956) - Atsuo Kuroda
 Silver Snake Iwashiya (1956)
 Revenge of the Pearl Queen (1956) - Kenji Asamura
 Rōnin-gai (1957) - Gonbei Horo
 Awa odori naruto no kaizoku (1957)
 Escapade in Japan (1957) - Kei Tanaka
 Jirochō gaiden: Ōabare jirochō ikka (1957)
 The Mysterians (1957) - Gen. Morita
 Meiji tennō to Nichiro daisensō (1958)
 Satsujinki: Kumo-otoko (1958) - Kogorō Akechi
 The Hidden Fortress (1958) - General Hyoe Tadokoro
 Kumo-otoko no gyakushū (1958) - Kogorō Akechi
 Songokū (1959)
 Submarine I-57 Will Not Surrender (1959)
 The Human Condition (1959) - Naruto Nitōhei
 Watashi wa kai ni naritai (1959)
 Kunisada Chūji (1960) - Magistrate Jubei Matsui
 Storm Over the Pacific (1960)
 The Bad Sleep Well (1960) - Detective
 Yatarō gasa (1960) - Boss Daihachi
 Shii no tsūisekishâ (1960)
 The Story of Osaka Castle (1961) - Katsuyasu Sakakibara
 Yojimbo (1961) - Homma - Instructor Who Skips Town
 Ai to honoho to (1961) - Niimura
 Dobunezumi sakusen (1962)
 Chushingura: 47 Samurai (1962) - Yosobei Kajikawa
 Attack Squadron! (1963) - Yamato Commander Ito
 High and Low (aka The Ransom) (1963) - Chief of First Investigating Section
 Chintao yosai bakugeki meirei (aka Siege of Fort Bismarck) (1963)
 Hiken (1963)
 Atragon (1963) - Defense Commander
 Kokusai himitsu keisatsu (1964) - Meishi's Boss
 Kyo mo ware ozora ni ari (1964)
 Mothra vs. Godzilla (1964) - JSDF General
 Dagora the Space Monster (1964) - General Iwasa
 Horafuki taikoki (1964) - Yoshimoto Imagawa
 Samurai Assassin (1965) - Tatewaki Todo
 Kiga Kaikyo (1965) - Police Chief
 Zoku shachō ninpōchō (1965)
 Fūrai ninpōchō (1965)
 Taiheiyo kiseki no sakusen Kisuka (1965) - Akitani
 Frankenstein vs. Baragon (1965) - Osaka Police Chief
 Zero faita dai kūsen (1966)
 Nippon ankokugai (1966)
 Nihon ânkokugai (1966)
 Rampaging Dragon of the North (1966)
 Bosū wa ore no kenjū de (1966)
 Japan's Longest Day (1967) - Colonel Toyojiro Haga - CO Imperial Guards 2nd Infantry Regiment
 Ultraman (1967)
 Rengo kantai shirei chōkan Yamamoto Isoroku (1968) - Chūichi Nagumo
 Furesshuman wakadaishō (1969)
 Battle of the Japan Sea (1969) - Kamimura Hikonojō
 Hiko shonen: Wakamono no toride (1970) - Jiro Iwami - Boy
 Nora-neko rokku: Onna banchō (1970)
 The Militarists (1970) - Osami Nagano
 Tora! Tora! Tora! (1970) - Rear Admiral Tamon Yamaguchi
 Shiosai (1971)
 Shin Abashiri Bangaichi: Fubuki no Dai-Dassou (1971)
 Shin abashiri bangaichi: Arashi yobu shiretoko-misaki (1971)
 Bokyo Komori-uta (1972)
 Seishun no mon (1975) - Yabe Tora
 Nihon no jingi (1977)
 Fuyu no hana (1978) - Ryokichi Sakata
 Ultraman: Great Monster Decisive Battle (1979)
 Shikake-nin Baian (1981) - Hanemon Otowaya
 The Imperial Navy (1981) - Koshirō Oikawa 
 Kaikyō (1982)
 Namidabashi (1983)
 Detective Story (1983) - Gozo Kunizaki
 Mori no mukougawa (1988)
 Roppongi banana boys (1989) - Tayama (final film role)

References

External links

Japanese male film actors
People from Kurume
1912 births
1991 deaths
Deaths from liver cancer
Deaths from cancer in Japan
20th-century Japanese male actors